Susannah Walker Wise is an English television and stage actress.

Life and career 
She trained as an actress at the London Academy of Music and Dramatic Art, graduating in 1995. Wise is best known for her work in the British soap opera EastEnders and the Channel 4 comedy Peep Show.  On stage, she has had roles in Christopher Shinn's Where Do We Live and in Nina Raine's Rabbit. She also played Rebecca Shaw in the Channel 4 series Derek. She appeared in the final episode of Kavanagh QC, starring John Thaw, in 2001. In 2015 she portrayed Sylvie in the Mystery miniseries The Enfield Haunting.
In 2020 she appeared as Emily Helmsley in Father Brown episode 8.10 "The Tower of Lost Souls"

Filmography

Television

References

External links
 https://www.susannahwise.com
 

Living people
Alumni of the London Academy of Music and Dramatic Art
British film actresses
British soap opera actresses
British stage actresses
British television actresses
Year of birth missing (living people)
21st-century British actresses